The Wawona Hotel is a historic hotel located within southern Yosemite National Park, in California. It was declared a National Historic Landmark in 1987, and is on the National Register of Historic Places .

History
The Wawona Hotel is one of the oldest mountain resort hotels in California, and a classic of Victorian era resort design. The Victorian style hotel was built in 1876 to serve tourists visiting the nearby Mariposa Grove of Giant Sequoias (Sequoiadendron giganteum). As tourism increased, through 1916, the hotel built additional rooms and facilities. In addition, it cut more forest trails, as well as paths along the south fork of the Merced River.

The hotel is featured prominently in the 1964 World War II thriller 36 Hours, starring James Garner and Eva Marie Saint, in which the hotel serves as a U.S. military hospital in Waldshut, Germany.

On March 1, 2016, the Wawona Hotel was renamed Big Trees Lodge due to a legal dispute between the U.S. government, which owns the property, in conjunction with the new concessionaire, Aramark, and the outgoing concessionaire, Delaware North, which claimed rights to the trademarked name. The hotel regained its historic name on July 15, 2019, when a settlement was reached in the dispute.

Thomas Hill studio
Thomas Hill (painter) (1829–1908), a renowned landscape painter of the Hudson River School, had a studio at the Wawona Hotel late in life. He used the hotel pavilion as his painting studio and completed numerous works of the region. This is included in the listing on the National Register of Historic Places.

Features
It is one of the few historical period hotels still standing within Yosemite National Park's boundaries.

Most of the Wawona Hotel's 104 guestrooms open onto one of the hotel's deep verandas, which wrap around the first and second floors; they have open views of the gardened and natural landscapes. The hotel includes six historically distinctive buildings, built between 1876 and 1916. The rooms are furnished with antiques, period pieces, and vintage elements, and have no telephones or televisions in them. Outdoor recreation choices include quiet nature walks or scenic drives, and when snow arrives, nearby cross-country and downhill skiing and snowshoe routes.

Across from the hotel is a nine-hole , par 35 golf course, Yosemite National Park's only such facility. It is one of the few within any U.S. national park. The course is open daily from spring to fall, weather permitting. In operation since 1918, the golf course is the oldest in the Sierra Nevada.

See also
History of the Yosemite area
List of the northern Giant Sequoia groves — 3 in Yosemite.
List of plants of the Sierra Nevada (U.S.)
List of Yosemite destinations
National Register of Historic Places listings in Mariposa County, California
Bibliography of the Sierra Nevada (U.S.)

References

External links

Hotels in California
Hotel buildings completed in 1876
History of Mariposa County, California
Hotel buildings on the National Register of Historic Places in California
National Historic Landmarks in California
National Register of Historic Places in Mariposa County, California
National Register of Historic Places in Yosemite National Park
Companies based in Mariposa County, California
Hotels established in 1876
1876 establishments in California
Historic American Buildings Survey in California
Tourist attractions in Mariposa County, California
Victorian architecture in California
National Park lodges